The Senate Scholz I (German: Senat Scholz I) was the government of the German city-state of Hamburg from 7 March 2011 to 15 April 2015. The Cabinet was headed by First Mayor Olaf Scholz and was formed by the Social Democratic Party, who gained an overall majority in the last state-elections. On 7 March 2011 Scholz was elected and sworn in as Mayor by the state assembly. On 23 March 2011 he appointed the Senators and had them confirmed by the assembly.

Cabinet members hold the office of Senators and heads of their respective agency, except denoted otherwise.

The Senate 

|}

References

Cabinets of Hamburg
2011 establishments in Germany
2015 disestablishments in Germany
Olaf Scholz